Penicillium angulare is a fungus species of the genus of Penicillium which was isolated in north America.

See also
List of Penicillium species

References

Further reading
 Penicillium thiersii, Penicillium angulare and Penicillium decaturense, new species isolated from wood-decay fungi in North America and their phylogenetic placement from multilocus DNA sequence analysis

angulare
Fungi described in 2005